= Kansala (India) =

Kansala is a village in Rohtak district in Haryana State, India. Its Pin code is 124406 and its postal head office is in Rohtak. Kansala is a big village on the Rohtak to Sonipat State Highway. It has a very ancient and famous temple dedicated to Baba Haridas. There are two government schools for boys and girls separately till class XII Near by Baba Haridas Mandir. In Kansala a PNB bank branch also have a post office on main road.
